DJ Breezy is a Ghanaian DJ, Songwriter, record producer and audio engineer.
He was nominated in the "Producer of The Year" category at the 2015 All Africa Music Awards and won "Producer of The Year" at the 2015 Ghana Music Awards. He is currently affiliated to Black Avenue Musik.

Early life and education
DJ Breezy got his basic education at St. Michael Basic School. He further studied Music and Arts at the University of Ghana.

Career
DJ Breezy started production of music as a child, he began professional music production in 2008 and came into the limestone after being signed by Black Avenue Musik Group in 2012.

DJ Breezy has been credited for producing songs like "Tonga" by Joey B, "Personal Person" and "Shiehor"  by Dblack ft Castro, "Seihor" by Castro ft DBlack.

Selected production credits
 Seihor Dblack ft. Castro
 Personal Person by Dblack ft. Castro
 Tonga by Joey B
 Selfie by V.VIP
 My Dollars by Mc Galaxy
 Rise My Gun by Shatta Wale
 Forget Me Not by D-Black ft. Bisa Kdei
 Believe by M.anifest ft. Mugeez x Kwesta
 Inside  by Maccasio  ft. Zeal
 Inna Mi Party by Shatta Wale ft D-Black
 Shelele  by E.L
 Benedicta  by Joey B
 Joy Daddy by Criss Waddle ft Joey B
 DeDeeDe by Kontihene ft Yaa Pono
 Washing Bay by E.L
 Budum Budum by Vybrant Faya
 GoGaga by MC Galaxy  Ft. Cynthia Morgan & DJ Jimmy Jatt

Accolades

References

External links
 Verified Twitter Account

1987 births
Living people
Ghanaian DJs
Ghanaian record producers
People from Accra